The Department of Home Affairs was an Australian government department that existed between December 1977 and November 1980. It was the third so-named Australian Government department.

Scope
Information about the department's functions and/or government funding allocation could be found in the Administrative Arrangements Orders, the annual Portfolio Budget Statements and in the department's annual reports.

At its creation, the department dealt with:
Administration of Norfolk Island, the Territory of Cocos (Keeling) Islands, the Territory of Christmas Island and the Coral Sea Islands  Territory
Women's Affairs
Support for the arts and letters
National archives
National museums

Structure
The department was an Australian Public Service department, staffed by officials who were responsible to the Minister for Home Affairs, Bob Ellicott.

References

Home Affairs
Ministries established in 1977